Dalmatia Tower is a high-rise office building and a hotel in Split, Croatia. It is located on the intersection of the Domovinskog rata Street and the Dubrovačka Street and it is the tallest building in Croatia.

Technical information 
Dalmatia Tower is ranked 1st by height in Croatia. It is 115 meters (377 feet) tall, and has 27 floors.
There is a radio mast on the roof, which increases the height of the tower to 135 meters (443 feet). There are five underground levels, used for parking spaces.
The building is served by eight elevators. Four elevators serves floors 1 to 15 where the office space is located and the remaining four elevators serves floors 16 to 27. This space is occupied by Courtyard by Marriott hotel except the top floor which features a sky bar with an observation deck.

History 
The building is a part of the Westgate Towers complex, which includes two skyscrapers. First one to be built was a 12-story, 55 meters tall, Westgate Tower A, housing the headquarters of Splitska Banka, which started construction in mid 2015 and opened in late 2016. Second tower was initially called Westgate Tower B, and its initial floor count was 17 with a height of 75 meters. Construction started in late 2016, however, upon reaching the 17th floor the work was halted for six months until the developer acquired the new building permit allowing the erection of additional 10 floors, now totaling 27. The work on the tower resumed in mid 2018. In late 2017 Westgate project received an International Property Award for the best office high-rise in Europe. Construction was completed in 2022.

See also 
 List of tallest buildings in Croatia

Gallery

References

External links 
 Westgate Group website

Skyscraper office buildings in Croatia
Buildings and structures in Split, Croatia
Tourism in Split